1990–91 was the 16th season that Division 1 operated as the second tier of ice hockey in Sweden, below the top-flight Elitserien (now the SHL).

Format 
Division 1 was divided into four starting groups of 10 teams each. The top two teams in each group qualified for the Allsvenskan, while the remaining eight teams had to compete in a qualifying round. The teams were given zero to seven bonus points based on their finish in the first round. The top two teams from each qualifying round qualified for the playoffs. The last-place team in each of the qualifying groups was relegated directly to Division 2, while the second-to-last-place team had to play in a relegation series.

Of the 10 teams in the Allsvenskan - in addition to the eight participants from Division 1, the two last place teams from the Elitserien also participated - the top two teams qualified directly for the Allsvenskan final, from which the winner was promoted directly to the Elitserien (now the SHL). The second place team qualified for the Kvalserien, which offered another opportunity to be promoted. The third and fourth place teams in the Allsvenskan qualified for the third round of the playoffs, while teams that finished fifth through eighth played in the second round. The three playoff winners qualified for the Kvalserien, in which the first-place team qualified for the following Elitserien season.

Regular season

Northern Group

First round

Qualification round

Western Group

First round

Qualification round

Eastern Group

First round

Qualification round

Southern Group

First round

Qualification round

Allsvenskan

Final 
 Västra Frölunda HC - Leksands IF 1:3 (3:6, 1:2, 8:2, 1:5)

Playoffs

First round 
 Bodens IK - Uppsala AIS 2:0 (6:5 OT, 6:5)
 Väsby IK - Sundsvall IF/Timrå IK 2:0 (3:2, 2:0)
 Rögle BK - Arvika HC 2:0 (6:2, 7:2)
 IF Troja-Ljungby - Örebro IK 2:0 (4:3 OT, 4:3 OT)

Second round 
 Mora IK - Rögle BK 0:2 (3:5, 1:7)
 IK Vita Hästen - Bodens IK 2:1 (7:0, 4:5 OT, 2:1)
 Mölndals IF - Väsby IK 2:0 (7:4, 4:1)
 Boro HC - IF Troja-Ljungby 2:1 (2:3 OT, 4:3 OT, 5:2)

Third round 
 Huddinge IK - Boro HC 0:2 (2:3 OT, 2:5)
 IF Björklöven - Mölndals IF 0:2 (2:5, 2:3)
 Rögle BK - IK Vita Hästen 2:1 (2:1 OT, 3:4 OT, 5:1)

Elitserien promotion

External links 
Season on hockeyarchives.info

Swedish Division I seasons
2
Swe